"Of the Manner of Addressing Clouds" is a poem from Wallace Stevens's first book of poetry,  Harmonium (1923). It was first published in 1921 according to Librivox and is therefore in the public domain.

One reading is that the poem expresses Stevens's distrust of the reason of doleful philosophers and "gloomy grammarians", which creates a layer of obfuscation or "clouds" that occludes the illumination of imagination, "the sun and moon". The clouds may be those of Aristophanes' play, The Clouds, which ridiculed Socrates and the intellectual fashions of the time. The speech of clouds would contrast with "the simplest of speech" that would be enough for those who know "the ultimate plato", as Stevens writes in Homunculus et la Belle Étoile. The poem is consistent with what Stevens called his "pagan" skepticism about religion in Sunday Morning (poem), and his distrust of rationalist philosophy ("rationalists, wearing square hats").

Notes 

1921 poems
American poems
Poetry by Wallace Stevens